Karin Büttner-Janz  ( Janz, born 17 February 1952) is a German medical doctor who won world and Olympic gold medals in artistic gymnastics for East Germany. From 1990 to 2012, she was chief physician of clinics in Berlin, Germany. She has a foundation named Spinefoundation.

Gymnastics career
Her first coach was her father Guido Janz, who taught her excellent basics. Büttner-Janz moved to a sports school in Forst, where she trained under Klaus Helbeck. Her final coach was Jürgen Heritz.

In 1967, at the age of 15, Büttner-Janz was nominated as East German Athlete of the Year after a silver medal on the uneven bars and a bronze medal on the vault at the European championship in Amsterdam. She went on to win the silver medal on the uneven bars and a bronze medal as part of the country's gymnastics team at the 1968 Summer Olympics.

At the 1970 world championships she overcame Ludmilla Tourischeva on the uneven bars to win the gold medal. In a controversial finish, she delivered another gold medal winning performance on the uneven bars at the 1972 Munich Olympics, defeating Olga Korbut on her favourite apparatus. She also won the gold medal on the vault, a silver medal as part of the East German women's gymnastic team, another prestigious silver medal in the all around competition, with Ludmilla Tourischeva of the Soviet Union winning the gold and Tamara Lazakovich of the Soviet Union winning the bronze, and bronze on the balance beam.  Most believed she was robbed of the All Around title, especially as with almost the exact same performances she outscored Tourischeva by a whopping 0.65 of a point (more than a fall) in the event finals 4 routines combined.   She was the most successful German athlete at the 1972 Summer Olympics in Munich and was afterwards recognized as GDR (German Democratic Republic) Sportswoman of the Year in 1972. After these successes she announced her intention of ending her competitive career to turn to the study of medicine to become a physician.

Büttner-Janz has an uneven bars element named after her, the Janz Salto, which she first performed in competition at the SV Dynamo Spartakiade in East Berlin, 1971.

Academic physician

Büttner-Janz studied at the Humboldt University in East Berlin beginning in 1971 and earned her diploma in emergency medicine. Later, she conducted her clinical semester at the orthopedic hospital of the Charité and went on to specialize in orthopaedics. She obtained her postdoctoral lecture qualification (habilitation treatise) through her work on the development of an artificial spine disk, known as the Charité Disc. She developed the device together with her colleague Kurt Schellnack. In 1990, Büttner-Janz moved from the Charité Berlin to the orthopedic clinic of Berlin-Hellersdorf, in 2004 to the Vivantes clinic of Berlin-Friedrichshain. From 2008 to 2012, she was additionally Chief Physician of the Vivantes clinic in Berlin-Kreuzberg.

In 2005, she became Extraordinary Professor at the Charité-Unviversitätsmedizin Berlin. From 2008 to 2009 she was president of the Spine Arthroplasty Society (later renamed to International Society for the Advancement of Spine Surgery).

From 2014 to 2016, she studied at the Hochschule für Technik und Wirtschaft Berlin und became Master of Business Administration (MBA) in general management.

Honours

1972 – awarded the title of Merited Master of Sport of the USSR.
2003 – inducted into the International Gymnastics Hall of Fame.

See also

List of top Olympic gymnastics medalists

References

External links

 
 
  
  

1952 births
Living people
People from Lübben (Spreewald)
East German physicians
East German women
German orthopedic surgeons
German women physicians
German women scientists
German female artistic gymnasts
Sportspeople from Brandenburg
Gymnasts at the 1968 Summer Olympics
Gymnasts at the 1972 Summer Olympics
Olympic gold medalists for East Germany
Olympic silver medalists for East Germany
Olympic bronze medalists for East Germany
Olympic gymnasts of East Germany
Olympic medalists in gymnastics
World champion gymnasts
Medalists at the World Artistic Gymnastics Championships
European champions in gymnastics
Medalists at the 1972 Summer Olympics
Medalists at the 1968 Summer Olympics
Recipients of the National Prize of East Germany
Recipients of the Patriotic Order of Merit in gold
Recipients of the Order of Merit of Berlin
Honoured Masters of Sport of the USSR
20th-century German women
LGBT gymnasts
German LGBT sportspeople